Ceyhun Oqtay oğlu Sultanov (born 12 June 1979) is a retired Azerbaijani footballer who last played as a central midfielder for Azerbaijan Premier League club Gabala. He was voted Azerbaijani Footballer of the Year in 2006. Sultanov has made 16 appearances for the Azerbaijan national football team.

Career
On 8 January 2013, Sultanov signed a one-year contract with Gabala FC.

Career statistics

Club

International

International goals

Honours

Club
FC Baku
Azerbaijan Premier League (1): 2005-06
Azerbaijan Cup (1): 2004–05

Khazar Lankaran
Azerbaijan Cup (1): 2007–08
CIS Cup (1): 2008

Individual
Azerbaijani Footballer of the Year (1): 2006

References

External links

1979 births
Living people
Footballers from Baku
Association football midfielders
Azerbaijani footballers
Azerbaijan international footballers
Azerbaijani expatriate footballers
Expatriate footballers in Iran
Machine Sazi F.C. players
Khazar Lankaran FK players
Gabala FC players
Sumgayit FK players